Saud ibn Ibrahim ibn Muhammad al-Shuraim (Arabic: سعود بن ابراهيم بن محمد الشريم; born 19 January 1966), was one of the prayer leaders and Friday preachers at the Grand Mosque Masjid al-Haram in Makkah. A Quranic reciter, he also holds a Ph.D degree in Sharia (Islamic studies) at the Umm al-Qura University in Mecca. Shuraim was recently appointed as dean and "Specialist Professor in Fiqh" at the University.

Shuraim used to lead the Taraweeh prayers during Ramadan in Mecca since 1991. He also led the funeral prayer for Crown Prince Nayef bin Abdulaziz on 17 June 2012 after Maghrib (sunset) prayer in Masjid Al Haram. King Abdullah of Saudi Arabia and the royal families were present at this funeral.

Career
In 1991, he was made a prayer leader and Friday preacher at the Grand Mosque by the order of King Fahd. A year after that, he was appointed judge in the High court of Makkah. Further to this, he was approved and made to teach in the Holy Masjid al-Haram. He has been serving as a professor at the Umm al-Qura University in Makkah since 1995, and has been named the dean of the faculty of "Shari'ah and Islamic Studies". In June 2010, he was promoted from the rank of professor to the specialist professor in fiqh by the president of the university Bakri bin Mat'ooq. He is currently retired.

On 6 April 2018, Saudi authorities closed Shuraim’s twitter page because he had posted comments about political and social issues in the Kingdom and criticised what he believed are violations of Islamic teachings

In December 2022, he resigned from his position as the Imam of Masjid Al Haram.

Personal life
Shuraim's family is from the Haraqees of the Banu Zayd tribe of Saudi Arabia.

In an interview with the Al Watan newspaper, when asked about his wife's role in his success, Shuraim stated:

References

External links

 Quran recitation by Saoud Al-Shuraim on Google Play (free listening and free download)
 haramainrecordings.com - Recent recordings (audio / video) of Sa'ud Al-Shuraim from Masjid al-Haram
 shuraym.com - Unofficial Website of Imam Al-Shuraim
 Download Sheikh Sa'ud Al-Shuraim's recitation of Al-Quran in mp3 format

1966 births
Living people
Saudi Arabian Quran reciters
Saudi Arabian Islamic religious leaders
Sunni imams
Saudi Arabian Sunni Muslim scholars of Islam
Saudi Arabian Salafis
Saudi Arabian imams
Muslim scholars of Islamic jurisprudence
Sharia judges
20th-century imams
21st-century imams
Umm al-Qura University alumni
Imam Muhammad ibn Saud Islamic University alumni
People from Riyadh